King Xi of Han (Chinese: 韩釐王 or 韩僖王); pinyin: Hán Xī Wáng (died 273 BC), ancestral name Jì (姬), clan name Hán (韩), personal name Jiù (咎), was the ruler of the State of Han between 295 BC and until his death in 273 BC. He was the son of King Xiang of Han. 

In 293 BC, King Xi sent Gongsun Xi (公孙喜) to lead an alliance of Han, Wei, and Zhou forces of 240,000 to attack Qin. The resulting Battle of Yique ended in alliance defeat and capture of Gongsun Xi. The defeated troops were executed and Han lost an additional 5 cities according to Zizhi Tongjian. In 295 BC, Qin attacked and took Wan (宛), modern-day Nanyang, Henan. In 296 BC, Han ceded 200 li around Wusui (武遂), southwest of modern Linfen or southeast of modern Yuanqu County, to Qin. In 286 BC, Qin defeated a Han army in Xiashan (夏山), within modern-day Yuzhou, Henan.

In 284 BC, King Xi met with King Zhao of Qin in Western Zhou (西周国) to form an alliance against Qi. According to Zizhi Tongjian, the alliance was led by Yan and also included Wei and Zhao. The alliance sacked the capital of Qi. King Min of Qi initially escaped capture, but was eventually executed.

In 275 BC, Qin attacked Wei. Han sent Bao Zheng (暴蒸) or Bao Yuan (暴鸢) to help Wei, but was defeated. Qin executed 40,000 Han soldiers.

In 273 BC, Wei and Zhao attacked Han at Huayang (华阳), in modern-day Xinzheng. Han requested helped from Qin, but Qin would not help. Han again requested help, this time sending Chen Shi (陈筮). The chancellor of Qin, Wei Ran (魏冉), received Chen Shi and asked whether he was sent because of the desperate state in Han. Chen Shi replied no. Wei Ran became angry and asked why Chen Shi claimed the situation was fine when Han repeatedly asked for help. Chen replied that if the situation was truly desperate, Han would have sought protectorship from a different state. Wei Ran immediately sent help and defeated Wei and Zhao at Huayang.

King Xi died in 273 BC and was succeeded by his son King Huanhui of Han.

Ancestors

References

Shiji Chapter 45
Zizhi Tongjian Volume 4

273 BC deaths
Zhou dynasty nobility
Monarchs of Han (state)
Year of birth unknown